Jamie B. Waller is a British businessman. He founded the debt collection company, JBW Group, a fintech solutions company, Hito, and later the private equity firm, Firestarters, where he serves as chief executive.

Early life and education
Waller was born in London's East End. He attended Raine's Foundation School, but left with no qualifications. He later studied business at Cranfield University, Stanford University, and the London Business School.

In 2018, Cranfield University awarded him the Entrepreneur of the Year award.

Career
Waller started working as a debt collector, but quit at the age of 21, planning to travel the world for a year. In Australia he started a business building and selling camper vans for other tourists.

He founded the debt collection company, JBW Group, in 2004. In 2014 the firm attempted unsuccessfully to obtain a legal injunction preventing the BBC from airing a Panorama episode critical of the company's practices. In 2015 the Crown Prosecution Service dropped charges against a man arrested for allegedly assaulting a JBW bailiff, concluding that the bailiff was trespassing and that the man was within his rights to use reasonable force to eject him. In 2017, he sold the business to a Japanese company, Outsourcing Inc. Waller founded the financial services technology company, Hito, six days after selling JBW Group. In 2017 the company was also sold to Outsourcing Inc.

In 2009, the UK Ministry of Justice (MoJ) issued a series of contracts for bailiff services to be provides for magistrates courts in England and Wales. JBW Group's tender was unsuccessful and the Group challenged the MoJ, alleging that there had been a breach of the Public Contracts Regulations 2006 in the way the tender exercise had been undertaken. Their claim was dismissed on the basis that the contracts concerned were service concessions and not public services contracts, and the dismissal was upheld by the Court of Appeal in 2012.

Waller founded the private equity business, Firestarters, in 2017.

Media
Waller featured in the BBC's Bailiffs TV show for two years beginning in 2000 along with other members of WiseHill and JBW staff. He was also featured in the follow-up show The Enforcers and in the debt advice show Beat the Bailiff.

Waller's first book was published in 2018. He also launched the Unsexy Business podcast to support the book in 2019.

References

Living people
British businesspeople
Place of birth missing (living people)
Year of birth missing (living people)